Kurt Richards (born 15 September 1987) is a New Zealand cricketer who plays for Central Districts.

References

External links
 

1987 births
Living people
New Zealand cricketers
Central Districts cricketers
Cricketers from Napier, New Zealand